I. N. Ulianov Chuvash State University is a public university located in Cheboksary, the capital of the Chuvash Republic, Russia. The university is one of the leading institutions of higher learning in Russia and is the scientific, educational and cultural center of the Privolsky Federal Region of the Russian Federation, which is highly regarded among national universities.

Chuvash State University has over 10,000 students and 3,865 faculty, including 150 Professors (Dr. Habil.) and 600 Docents (Ph.D.).
The rector is Andrey Aleksandrov.

History
In 1920 the revolutionary committee and the first congress of Councils of the Chuvash Autonomous district decided to create a university Cheboksary.

The question about the creation of the Chuvash State University was raised again in 1958–1959, but even then it could not be done because of many problems connected with the absence of the material base and lack of scientific staff in the republic.

The university was formed on 17 August 1967 through a merger of the Volga Branch of the Order of Lenin Moscow Energy Institute and the Historical-Philological Department of the I. Ya. Yakovlev Chuvash State Pedagogical Institute. It was named after Ilya Nikolaevich Ulianov, an educator.

Opened already in 1930 the part of historically philological faculty of the Chuvash Pedagogical Institute joined the university. By the time of the university creation there had been about 900 students (including 350 full-time students) and highly qualified scientifically pedagogical staff, 3 professors and 30 senior lecturers among them. The historically philological faculty got wide popularity and many traditions during its existence.

In 1968-1969 they opened the eighth faculty of Physics and Mathematics at the university.

Faculties 
The university has 15 faculties:

 Faculty of Informatics and Computer Engineering
 Faculty of Applied Mathematics, Physics and Information Technology
 Faculty of Radio Electronics and Automation
 Faculty of Civil Engineering
 Faculty of Mechanical Engineering
 Faculty of Energy and Electrical Engineering
 Faculty of Management and Social Technologies
 Faculty of History and Geography
 Faculty of Medicine
 Faculty of Chemistry and Pharmacy
 Faculty of Foreign Languages
 Faculty of Russian and Chuvash Philology and Journalism
 Faculty of Economics
 Faculty of Law
 Faculty of Arts

These are further subdivided into 88 departments.

Notable alumni 
 Nikolay Fyodorov – Russian politician and former President of the Chuvash Republic
 Yulia Polyachikhina – Russian model and Miss Russia 2018

See also
 Chuvash State Pedagogical University
 Cheboksary Physics and Mathematics School
 Chuvash State Academic Song and Dance Ensemble
 Chuvash State Symphony Capella

References

External links
 Main University Webpage

 
Universities in Volga Region
Buildings and structures in Chuvashia
Cheboksary